The Rise and Fall of the Great Powers: Economic Change and Military Conflict from 1500 to 2000, by Paul Kennedy, first published in 1987, explores the politics and economics of the Great Powers from 1500 to 1980 and the reason for their decline. It then continues by forecasting the positions of China, Japan, the European Economic Community (EEC), the Soviet Union and the United States through the end of the 20th century.

Summary
Kennedy argues that the strength of a Great Power can be properly measured only relative to other powers, and he provides a straightforward thesis: Great Power ascendancy (over the long term or in specific conflicts) correlates strongly to available resources and economic durability;  military overstretch and a concomitant relative decline are the consistent threats facing powers whose ambitions and security requirements are greater than their resource base can provide for. 

Throughout the book he reiterates his early statement (page 71): "Military and naval endeavors may not always have been the raison d'être of the new nations-states, but it certainly was their most expensive and pressing activity", and it remains such until the power's decline.  He concludes that declining countries can experience greater difficulties in balancing their preferences for guns, butter and investments.

Kennedy states his theory in the second paragraph of the introduction as follows:  

Kennedy adds on the same page:

Early modern era
The book starts at the dividing line between the Renaissance and early modern history—1500 (chapter 1).  It briefly discusses the Ming (page 4) and Muslim worlds (page 9) of the time and the rise of the western powers relative to them (page 16).  The book then proceeds chronologically, looking at each of the power shifts over time and the effect on other Great Powers and the "Middle Powers".

Kennedy uses a number of measures to indicate real, relative and potential strength of nations throughout the book.  He changes the metric of power based on the point in time. Chapter 2, "The Habsburg Bid for Mastery, 1519–1659" emphasizes the role of the "manpower revolution" in changing the way Europeans fought wars (see military revolution). This chapter also emphasizes the importance of Europe's political boundaries in shaping a political balance of power.

European imperialism
The Habsburg failure segues into the thesis of chapter 3, that financial power reigned between 1660 and 1815, using Britain, France, Prussia, Austria-Hungary, and Russia to contrast between powers that could finance their wars (Britain and France) and powers that needed financial patronage to mobilize and maintain a major military force on the field. Kennedy presents a table (page 81, table 2) of "British Wartime Expenditures and Revenue"; between 1688 and 1815 is especially illustrative, showing that Britain was able to maintain loans at around one-third of British wartime expenditures throughout that period
 Total wartime expenditures, 1688–1815: £2,293,483,437
 Total income: £1,622,924,377
 Balance raised by loans: £670,559,060
 Loans as per cent of expenditure: 33.3%

The chapter also argues that British financial strength was the single most decisive factor in its victories over France during the 18th century. This chapter ends on the Napoleonic Wars and the fusion of British financial strength with a newfound industrial strength.

Industrial Revolution
Kennedy's next two chapters depend greatly upon Bairoch's calculations of industrialization, measuring all nations by an index, where 100 is the British per capita industrialization rate in 1900. The United Kingdom grows from 10 in 1750, to 16 in 1800, 25 in 1830, 64 in 1860, 87 in 1880, to 100 in 1900 (page 149). In contrast, France's per capita industrialization was 9 in 1750, 9 in 1800, 12 in 1830, 20 in 1860, 28 in 1880, and 39 in 1900. Relative shares of world manufacturing output (also first appearing on page 149) are used to estimate the peaks and troughs of power for major states. China, for example, begins with 32.8% of global manufacturing in 1750 and plummets after the First Opium War, Second Opium War and Taiping Rebellion to 19.7% of global manufacturing in 1860, and 12.5% in 1880 (compared to the UK's 1.9% in 1750, growing to 19.9% in 1860, and 22.9% in 1880).

20th century
Measures of strength in the 20th century (pages 199–203) use population size, urbanization rates, Bairoch's per capita levels of industrialization, iron and steel production, energy consumption (measured in millions of metric tons of coal equivalent), and total industrial output of the powers (measured against Britain's 1900 figure of 100), to gauge the strength of the various great powers.

Kennedy also emphasizes productivity increase, based on systematic interventions, which led to economic growth and prosperity for great powers in the 20th century.

He compares the great powers at the close of the 20th century and predicts the decline of the Soviet Union, the rise of China and Japan, the struggles and potential for the European Economic Community (EEC), and the relative decline of the United States.  He highlights the precedent of the "Four Modernizations" in Deng Xiaoping's plans for China—agriculture, industry, science and military—de-emphasizing military, while the United States and  Soviet Union are emphasizing it.  He predicts that continued deficit spending, especially on military build-up, will be the single most important reason for decline of any great power.

The United States
From the Civil War to the first half of the 20th century, the United States' economy benefited from high agricultural production, plentiful raw materials, technological advancements and financial inflows.  During this time the U.S. did not have to contend with foreign dangers.  From 1860 to 1914, U.S. exports increased sevenfold, resulting in huge trade surpluses.  By 1945 the U.S. both enjoyed high productivity and was the only major industrialized nation intact after World War II.  From the 1960s onward, the U.S. saw a relative decline in its share of world production and trade.  By the 1980s, the U.S. experienced declining exports of agricultural and manufactured goods.  In the space of a few years, the U.S. went from being the largest creditor to the largest debtor nation.  At the same time, the federal debt was growing at an increasing pace.  This situation is typical of declining hegemons.

The United States has the typical problems of a great power, which include balancing guns and butter and investments for economic growth.  The U.S.' growing military commitment to every continent (other than Antarctica) and the growing cost of military hardware severely limit available options.  Kennedy compares the U.S.' situation to Great Britain's prior to World War I.  He comments that the map of U.S. bases is similar to Great Britain's before World War I.

As military expenses grow, this reduces investments in economic growth, which eventually "leads to the downward spiral of slower growth, heavier taxes, deepening domestic splits over spending priorities, and weakening capacity to bear the burdens of defense".  Kennedy's advice is as follows:

Table of contents
 Strategy and Economics in the Preindustrial World
The Rise of the Western World
The Habsburg Bid for Mastery, 1519–1659
Finance, Geography, and the Winning of Wars, 1660–1815
 Strategy and Economics in the Industrial Era
Industrialization and the Shifting Global Balances, 1815–1885
The Coming of a Bipolar World and the Crisis of the "Middle Powers": Part One, 1885–1918
The Coming of a Bipolar World and the Crisis of the "Middle Powers": Part Two, 1919–1942
 Strategy and Economics Today and Tomorrow
Stability and Change in a Bipolar World, 1943–1980
To the Twenty-first Century

Maps, tables and charts
The book has twelve maps, forty-nine tables and three charts to assist the reader in understanding the text.

Publication data
The Rise and Fall of the Great Powers is the eighth and best-known book by historian Paul Kennedy. It reached number six on the list of best-selling hardcover books for 1988. In 1988 the author was awarded the Wolfson History Prize for this work.

Republished: January 1989, Paperback, 704 pages

See also
 Great power
 The Rise of the Great Powers
 Upward Spiral
 List of regions by past GDP (PPP) per capita
 Economic history of the United States
 Empire
 Ideocracy
 State collapse

References

External links
 The Rise and Fall of the Great Powers at Archive.org 
 Imperial Cycles: Bucks, Bullets and Bust January 10, 1988, New York Times Book Review, requires registration
 PBS Newshour interview the author, 2010 - 25-year perspective

1987 non-fiction books
Books about civilizations
Books by Paul Kennedy
Political realism
History of international relations
Books about geopolitics
Books about wealth distribution
Random House books